Herschel Maurice Margoliouth (22 February 1887 – 20 March 1959) was a British poet and literary scholar who was professor of English at University College of Southampton (1921–25) and later secretary of faculties at Oxford University (1925–47). He was a fellow of Oriel College from 1935.

Selected publications
The Poems and Letters of Andrew Marvell.
Intimation and Other Poems, Oxford University Press, Oxford, 1948.
William Blake. 1951. (Home University Library of Modern Knowledge)
Wordsworth and Coleridge 1795-1831, Oxford University Press, 1953. (Home University Library of Modern Knowledge No. 223)
William Blake's Vala: Blake's Numbered Text, Oxford University Press, 1956.

References 

1887 births
1959 deaths
Fellows of Oriel College, Oxford
British poets